Henry C. Gale House may refer to:

Henry C. Gale House (495 N. 1st East, Beaver, Utah), listed on the National Register of Historic Places (NRHP)
Henry C. Gale House (500 North, Beaver, Utah), listed on the National Register of Historic Places in Beaver County, Utah